Elias Edison Mordal (born 20 January 1998), also known by his birth name Edison Suerti, is a  former professional footballer who played as a right back.

Born in the Philippines and raised in Norway, he has played for Norwegian clubs Molde, Sunndal, and Brattvåg, as well as for the Norway under-19 team. He represented the Philippines under-22 team in the 2019 Southeast Asian Games.

Early life
Mordal was born in Cotabato City, Philippines as Edison Suerti. His biological mother placed him at the Children's Shelter of Cebu, an orphanage in Cebu City. When he was 18 months old, Norwegian musicians Jens and Lena Mordal adopted him and renamed him Elias Edison Mordal. He was then raised in Molde, Norway with two adoptive siblings.

His adoptive father, Jens, is passionate about football and introduced the young Elias to the sport. When he was five, Jens took him to local club Træff. He later joined the youth team of Molde Fotballklubb.

Club career

Molde II
He was promoted to Molde II, the B-team of his club.

Loan to Sunndal
In September 2018, Mordal joined 3. divisjon club Sunndal on a 3-month loan.

Brattvåg
In January 2019, Mordal joined 2. divisjon club Brattvåg. He made his debut for Brattvåg in a 4–2 away defeat to Byåsen.

Azkals Development Team
In March 2020, Mordal was listed in the squad of the Azkals Development Team in the Philippines Football League. However, when the league season began in October, he was not a player of the team.

Retirement
In January 2021, through an Instagram post, he announced his retirement from football at the age of 22. He cited "a lack of spark, lack of belief and lack of motivation" and that he "didn't feel the happiness anymore" in football.

International career

Norway U-19
In January 2017, Mordal was called up for the Norway U-19, he made his full debut in a 2–1 win against Ireland U-19.

Philippines U-22 Olympic
Mordal was part of the Philippines U-22 Olympic squad that competed in the 2019 Southeast Asian Games held in Philippines.

Philippines
In March 2019, it was reported that Mordal received an invitation to train with the Philippines national team. He received his first call up for the Philippines in June 2019 for a friendly against China, but eventually did not take part due to eligibility constraints. He made his unofficial debut for the Philippines in a scoreless friendly draw with Guangzhou Evergrande. Clearance is being secured to resolve his eligibility issues that would enable him to make his first official appearance for the Philippines.

References

External links

 

1998 births
Living people
Association football defenders
Norwegian people of Filipino descent
Filipino footballers
Norwegian footballers
Norway youth international footballers
Competitors at the 2019 Southeast Asian Games
Brattvåg IL players
Azkals Development Team players
Southeast Asian Games competitors for the Philippines